George Spafford Evans (August 8, 1826 – September 17, 1883) was a military officer, miner, businessman, County Clerk for Tuolumne County, Customs official and Senate Clerk for the State of California.

Early life
Born on August 8, 1826 in Tecumseh, Michigan, George S. Evans came to California in 1849 from Texas, where he had served in the Texas Rangers during the Mexican–American War. He was involved in mining, business, and later in government work for both Tuolumne County and the State of California. He married Fannie Markham of Sonora in 1857 and they would have six children.

Civil War
After the outbreak of the American Civil War, on October 16, 1861, Evans, joined the California Volunteers with the "Tuolumne Rangers" at Camp Alert in San Francisco. This unit later became Company E of the 2nd California Volunteer Cavalry. He was commissioned as a major.

Promoted a lieutenant colonel, he led the regiment during their first two campaigns in the Owens Valley Indian War and later in Utah Territory where he was promoted to colonel of the regiment; receiving the brevet for brigadier general.

In late 1863 he resigned his commission and returned to California, where he was elected to the California State Senate in September. He was appointed Adjutant General of California in July 1864, with the rank of brigadier general. He continued in that office until May 1, 1868.

Later life
He was elected again to the state senate in September 1865, while holding the office of adjutant general.  After serving as adjutant general, Evans served as Stockton City Councilman (1869), then mayor of Stockton (1870).  He was then elected again to the California State Senate in consecutive terms from 1871 to 1877.  He was a Candidate for Senate President Pro Tem in 1874 and 1878.  He made an unsuccessful bid to be the Republican Party's gubernatorial candidate in 1880.  He then moved to San Francisco with his family in 1880, after he was appointed as the State Harbor Commissioner. He remained there until his death in 1883. He died in San Francisco on September 17, 1883, with California newspapers reporting that he had died from either a morphine overdose or stroke.

See also
List of American Civil War brevet generals (Union)

References

Research resources
 Online guide to the Bohnett-Evans Family Papers, 1853-1994, The Bancroft Library
 George S. Evans, from www.joincalifornia.com, accessed December 17, 2011 

1826 births
1883 deaths
People of California in the American Civil War
American military personnel of the Mexican–American War
Members of the Texas Ranger Division
Military history of California
Union Army colonels
California city council members
Mayors of places in California
Republican Party California state senators
County clerks in California
19th-century American politicians
People from Tecumseh, Michigan
People from Stockton, California
Owens Valley Indian War
Military personnel from Michigan
Union militia generals